John Renshaw Thomson (September 25, 1800September 12, 1862) was an American merchant and politician from New Jersey.

Life
Thomson was born in Philadelphia, Pennsylvania, the son of Edward Thomson (1771-1853) and Ann Renshaw (1773-1842).  His father along with an uncle, George Thomson, were shipowners extensively involved in the China Trade.

Thomson attended the common schools in Princeton, New Jersey, and the College of New Jersey (now Princeton University). In 1817, he went to China and assisted his father in the mercantile trade.  John served as the United States Consul to Canton from 1823 to 1825, succeeding his late brother Richard Renshaw Thomson, whose sudden death left the position vacant.

In 1825–26, Edward Thomson's business failed.  His son returned to the United States and, in the winter of 1825, married Annis Stockton, a daughter of Senator Richard Stockton and granddaughter of Continental Congressman Richard Stockton and poet Annis Boudinot Stockton.  The match brought many financial and political advantages.  The young couple settled in Princeton.

Thomson became a director and secretary of the Delaware and Raritan Canal Company and was president, and later treasurer, of the Philadelphia and Trenton Railroad. He was a delegate to the New Jersey State Constitutional Convention of 1844, and was the unsuccessful Democratic candidate for Governor of New Jersey the same year.

Thomson's wife Annis died in 1842; in 1845, he married Josephine A. Ward, daughter of congressman Aaron Ward of New York.  Thomson had no children with either wife.

Thomson was elected as a Democrat to the United States Senate to fill the vacancy caused by the resignation of his brother-in-law Robert F. Stockton. Thomson was re-elected in 1857, occupying the seat from March 4, 1853, until his death in Princeton, New Jersey.  He was chairman of the Committee on Patents and the Patent Office (36th United States Congress) and the Committee on Pensions (Thirty-sixth Congress).  Thomson was a friend of President James Buchanan, and supported repeal of the Missouri Compromise on the grounds that slavery was permitted under the United States Constitution, as well as the candidacy of John C. Breckinridge in the 1860 United States Presidential Election, but when southern states began to form the Confederate States of America after the election, Thomson supported the Union.

He was interred in Princeton Cemetery. In 1878, his widow Josephine married Maryland governor Thomas Swann.

See also
List of United States Congress members who died in office (1790–1899)

References

External links

Obit in The Congressional Globe (Vol. 54, part 1, page 7)

1800 births
1862 deaths
People of New Jersey in the American Civil War
People from Princeton, New Jersey
Princeton University alumni
Democratic Party United States senators from New Jersey
New Jersey Democrats
Burials at Princeton Cemetery
Politicians from Philadelphia
19th-century American politicians
American consuls
Stockton family of New Jersey